The House of Sharvashidze or Chachba or Shervashidze was a Georgian-Abkhazian ruling family of Principality of Abkhazia. The family was later recognized as one of the princely families of the Russian Empire at the request of King Heraclius II of Georgia in accordance with the list of Georgian noblemen presented in the Treaty of Georgievsk.

History
Although the surname is given in a standard Georgian form (particularly, the typical –dze suffix meaning "a son"), in the 12th century the family is said to have derived its original name from Shirvanshahs, a dynasty of Shirvan. According to the medieval The Georgian Chronicles, the Shirvanese princes were granted the possessions in the province of Abkhazia after David IV, one of Georgia's greatest kings, extended his kingdom to Shirvan in 1124 .

Anchabadze disputes this genealogy and argues that Sharvashidze was a local dynasty (they had another purely Abkhazian name Chachba) that had invented a foreign ancestry which is not unusual in feudal genealogies. It is believed by some that the princely (ruling) branch of the Sharvashidze family had the same patrilineal ancestors as the Anchabadzes.

The first representative of the dynasty assumed the princely powers under the authority of the Georgian kings circa 1325. It was not, however, until the final decomposition of the unified Georgian feudal state in the late 15th century, when the Abkhazian princes obtained their full independence, only to soon become vassals of the Ottoman Empire. That Turkish overlordship brought major changes in their palace culture and political leanings, with the Sharvashidze gradually losing their ties with the Christian Georgian nobility.

In the late 18th century, the Sharvashidze princes embraced Islam, but shifted back and forth across the religious divide, as the Russians and Ottomans struggled for controlling the area. The pro-Russian orientation prevailed, and Abkhazia joined Imperial Russia in 1810 while the Sharvashidzes were confirmed in the Russian princely rank in accordance with the Russo-Georgian Treaty of Georgievsk.

Today, Sefer-Ali Bey descendants of the family live in Bulgaria and United States, where they emigrated after the First World War.

According to Nikoloz/Nicolas Sharvashidze (Head descendant of Aslan-Bey) the elder descendants of the Aslan-Bey branch of the family live in Georgia, while the junior branch is said to have gone extinct in Turkey.

See also 
Principality of Abkhazia
List of Princes of Abkhazia

References

Sources 
 Georgi M. Derluguian, The Tale of Two Resorts: Abkhazia and Ajaria Before and Since and the Soviet Collapse. In: The Myth of "Ethnic Conflict": Politics, Economics, and "Cultural" Violence, edited by Beverly Crawford and Ronnie D. Lipschutz. University of California Press/University of California International and Area Studies Digital Collection, Edited Volume #98, pp. 261–292, 1998
 The Oath of Allegiance of Prince Sefer-Ali Bek to the Russian crown, August 23 1810 (text)
Russian Biographical Dictionary

 
Noble families of Georgia (country)
Russian noble families
Georgian-language surnames
Abkhazian nobility